The Valdivieso advertising sign (Spanish: letrero publicitario de Valdivieso) is a rooftop outdoor advertisement at 93 General Bustamante Street, Santiago, Chile. Erected around 1954, it was declared a National Monument of Chile on May 31, 2010.

The neon sign turns on at 9:00 PM during the summer and at 6:00 PM during the winter.

History 
The Valdivieso advertising sign was built in 1955 by the Luminosos Parragué company. General manager Claudio Parragué stated:

See also 
Monarch advertising sign
Boston Citgo sign

References

External links 
ID:2169 Consejo de Monumentos Nacionales (Chile)
Sitio web oficial del fabricante (Parragué)

Individual signs
National Monuments of Chile
Buildings and structures completed in 1955
Buildings and structures in Santiago
1955 establishments in Chile